Gustav Stolpe (né Gustav Erik Stolpe; 26 September 1833 – 3 October 1901) was a Swedish-American composer, conductor, and performer.

Career 
Gustav Stolpe was born in Torsåker Parish, Gästrikland, Sweden. He held the degree of Musikdirektör (Music Director) from the Royal Swedish Academy of Music (now Royal College of Music in Stockholm).

Gustav Stolpe is most frequently remembered as the composer of When Through the Torn Sail which was written with lyricist, Reginald Heber.

In 1882 Dr. Stolpe was named to the faculty of Augustana College, in Rock Island, Illinois, where he remained on the faculty for 11 years. In a typical week, he would teach seven organ lessons, six violin lessons, and ten vocal lessons. His work papers are included in the Manuscript Collections in the Thomas Tredway Library at Augustana College.

In 1893, he founded Dr. Stolpe's Music Conservatory in Moline, Illinois, and headed it until 1897, when he left to become head of music at Upsala College in Kenilworth, New Jersey.

Legacy 
Stolpe composed 38 operettas, 25 orchestral works, 25 pieces for brass band, and 25 piano solos.

Family 
One of his sons, Rev. Dr. Johan Gustaf Mauritz Stolpe (1858–1938), had been the rector of Gustavus Adolphus Lutheran Church in Manhattan, New York, at 155 East 22nd Street (between Lexington and Third Avenues), which in 1901, was the largest church of the denomination in the United States.

Death 
Stolpe died October 3, 1901, in Manhattan, New York. At the time of his death, he was head of music at Upsala College.

References

Sources
Gustav Erik Stolpe biography on the Augustana College website
Olson, Ernst W. The Swedish Element In Illinois Survey Of The Past Seven Decades (Chicago: Swedish-American Biographical Association. 1917)

External links
 

1833 births
1902 deaths
People from Hofors Municipality
Swedish composers
Swedish male composers
Swedish conductors (music)
Male conductors (music)
19th-century Swedish people
Swedish emigrants to the United States
Augustana College (Illinois) faculty
19th-century male musicians